Harry Aloysius "Babe" Connaughton (June 6, 1905 – August 11, 1969) was an American football player.  He played college football for the Georgetown Hoyas and professional football for the Frankford Yellow Jackets.  He was a consensus All-American in 1926.

Connaughton was born in Philadelphia in 1905 and attended Saint Joseph's Preparatory School in that city.  He enrolled at Georgetown University and, while there, played at the guard position on the Georgetown Hoyas football team in 1925 and 1926. He was a consensus selection for the 1926 College Football All-America Team. At six feet, four inches, and 250 pounds, he was a large player for his era.  He played for Hoyas teams that compiled a 16-3-1 in 1925 and 1926.  In December 1926, he was awarded the Veterans Cup as the most valuable player in eastern football.  He was inducted into the Georgetown University Athletic Hall of Fame in 1953.

Connaughton also played professional football for the Frankford Yellow Jackets during the 1927 NFL season.  He started 16 games at the guard position for the 1927 Yellow Jackets.

In 1938, he became the assistant to Michael Igoe, the United States Attorney in Chicago.  By  June 1938, his weight had dropped to 180 pounds from 260 pounds while playing football at Georgetown.

Connaughton died in 1969 ate age 64 in Braham, Minnesota.

References

1905 births
1969 deaths
All-American college football players
American football guards
Georgetown Hoyas football players
Frankford Yellow Jackets players
Players of American football from Philadelphia